Jonathan "Gabby" Price (born April 2, 1949) is a former American football coach. He served two stints as the head football coach at Husson University in Bangor, Maine, from a position from 2003 to 2008 and 2013 to 2019, compiling a record of 72–45. He was the first head football coach at Husson. Price was the head football coach at   Bangor High School in Bangor, Maine from 1976 to 1984 and again from 1992 to 2000, amassing a mark of 129–52–1.

Head coaching record

College

References

External links
 Husson profile

1949 births
Living people
Husson Eagles football coaches
Maine Black Bears football players
High school football coaches in Maine
Sportspeople from Bangor, Maine
Coaches of American football from Maine
Players of American football from Maine